Tareq Ahmed (born 12 March 1988) is an Emirati footballer. He currently plays as a midfielder for Al Nasr.

International career

International goals
Scores and results list the United Arab Emirates' goal tally first.

Honours
UAE President's Cup: 2014–15
UAE League Cup: 2019–20

External links

References

Emirati footballers
1988 births
Living people
Sharjah FC players
Al Jazira Club players
Al Ahli Club (Dubai) players
Al-Nasr SC (Dubai) players
United Arab Emirates international footballers
UAE Pro League players
Association football midfielders